Éder Ceccon (born 13 April 1983) is a Brazilian football player.

Club statistics

References

External links

Vegalta Sendai

1983 births
Living people
Brazilian footballers
São Paulo FC players
Avaí FC players
Clube Atlético Sorocaba players
Santos FC players
Paysandu Sport Club players
Esporte Clube Juventude players
Criciúma Esporte Clube players
Konyaspor footballers
Vegalta Sendai players
J1 League players
Brazilian expatriate footballers
Expatriate footballers in Japan
Expatriate footballers in Turkey
Association football forwards